Megas XLR is an American animated television series created by Jody Schaeffer and George Krstic for Cartoon Network. The series revolves around two teenage slackers: mechanic Coop and his best friend Jamie, who find a mecha robot from the future called Megas (Mechanized Earth Guard Attack System) in a New Jersey junkyard. Coop modifies Megas and replaces his head, the control center, with a classic muscle car, and names him XLR (eXtra Large Robot). Together with Megas's original pilot Kiva, they must defend Earth from the evil alien race called "the Glorft". The series is an homage and parody of mecha anime. Krstic was originally one of the co-creators of MTV's Downtown.

Schaeffer and Krstic conceived the idea of an animated series where the main character would pilot a giant robot utilizing his video gaming skills. The pilot episode, LowBrow, was shown in 2002 during Cartoon Network's Cartoon Cartoon Weekend Summerfest, to determine which pilot would become a new Cartoon Cartoon; it was the most popular among viewers. It aired on the Toonami block from May 1, 2004, to January 15, 2005, for two seasons (totaling 26 episodes), before being cancelled due to low ratings.

Despite low ratings, the series was met with positive reception, and was ranked at No. 4 on ToonZone's "Toons of the 2000s: Top 5 Cartoon Network Originals". There have been various fan efforts and petitions to revive the show since its cancellation.

Megas XLR was produced by Cartoon Network Studios; Titmouse, Inc. animated the main title and did animation work on Season 1.

Overview
In the year 3037, Earth is fighting a losing war against the Glorft, a hostile alien race led by Gorrath (Clancy Brown). In a last, desperate attempt to save the planet, the human resistance steals a prototype mecha robot from the Glorft and modifies it into a powerful war machine, renaming it Megas (Mechanized Earth Guard Attack System). Their plan is to use a time-traveling device called a time drive to send Megas and its assigned pilot, Kiva Andru (Wendee Lee), two years into the past to the Battle of the Last Stand, which was the last major offensive fought by humanity against the Glorft. Humanity lost that battle, but the members of the resistance, particularly Kiva, believe that Megas can tip the scales and hand the Glorft a decisive defeat.

Before the plan can be executed, however, an attack by the Glorft forces the human resistance to send Megas back in time before proper preparations are made. Megas' head is blown off in the attack and its time drive is damaged, and the crippled robot is inadvertently sent to a junkyard in 1930s New Jersey. It remains there until a slacker mechanic named "Coop" Cooplowski (David DeLuise) discovers it in approximately the year 2004. Coop turns Megas into a hot rod project by giving it a flaming paint job, replacing its head with a classic muscle car (resembling a car from the '70s MOPAR family; most likely a Plymouth Barracuda) and adding XLR (eXtra Large Robot) to its name.

While Coop is showing off the robot to his best friend Jamie (Steve Blum), Kiva travels to the 21st century to retrieve Megas and, upon discovering that only Coop can now pilot the robot due to his modifications to it, grudgingly agrees to train him in its use. However, Gorrath has followed her through time, forcing Kiva, Coop, and Jamie to team up and defend Earth against both Gorrath's forces and various other threats.

Episodes

Series overview

Pilot (2002)

Season 1 (2004)

Season 2 (2004–2005)

Production
While playing video games, Schaeffer and Krstic came up with an idea of making an animated series in which the main character would use his video gaming skills to pilot a giant robot. The pilot short (LowBrow) was shown in 2002 as part of Cartoon Network's Cartoon Cartoon Weekend Summerfest, a contest to determine which pilot would be selected as the next Cartoon Cartoon. It was the most popular among viewers, and was greenlit as a series.

Much of the series is inspired by Japanese mecha anime which the two grew up watching, with the animation being inspired by both anime and Western animation. The humour often pays homage or mocks anime conventions.

After being delayed from its original debut in December 2003, Megas XLR finally debuted on the Toonami block on May 1, 2004. However, due to low ratings, the series was cancelled after two seasons, with the final episode airing on January 15, 2005.

Reruns continued to air sporadically from January 16, 2005, to June 24, 2006. During this time, the series was later moved to the graveyard slot of 3:30am on Friday nights/Saturday mornings, before being removed from the network altogether.

Media
The entire series is available at the iTunes Store and on Xbox Video.

Future

Possible revival
In late 2012, fans of the show on Twitter started using the hashtag #BringBackMegasXLR. The co-creator George Krstic and director Chris Prynoski announced they would bring back the show; seeing as Megas XLR had been written off by Cartoon Network, the studio Titmouse, Inc. would have to get the rights to the show. On April 29, 2013, George Krstic posted a tweet saying that he and Chris Prynoski were having a meeting at Titmouse to discuss bringing back the show along with Motorcity. However, in a 2014 interview George Krstic was quoted as saying: "Megas was written off as a tax loss and as such can not be exploited, at least domestically, in any way, or the network will get into some sort of tax/legal trouble."

Potential video game
In December 2012, a series of messages were posted on Twitter by series director Chris Prynoski, hinting at production of a video game based on the series with Valve. No official comment on the project has yet been made by Valve or Cartoon Network. However, in 2015 Chris Prynoski mentioned on Twitter that he had been unable to sort out the licensing needed.

References

External links

 

 
2000s American animated television series
2000s American comic science fiction television series
2000s American parody television series
2000s American time travel television series
2004 American television series debuts
2005 American television series endings
American children's animated action television series
American children's animated adventure television series
American children's animated comic science fiction television series
American children's animated science fantasy television series
Anime-influenced Western animated television series
Animated television series about extraterrestrial life
Animated television series about robots
Cartoon Network original programming
Television series by Cartoon Network Studios
English-language television shows
Television series created by George Krstic
Television shows set in New Jersey
Toonami
Teen animated television series